The Plaza Blanca Historic District, in Plaza Blanca, New Mexico, is a  historic district which was listed on the National Register of Historic Places in 1986.  The listing included 17 contributing buildings.

The district includes 12 houses and six of their outbuildings, and includes, roughly Plaza Blanca and Old Puente Ford Roads adjacent to Plaza Blanca Ditch.  It also includes a church or capilla which is a converted school.

References

Historic districts on the National Register of Historic Places in New Mexico
National Register of Historic Places in Rio Arriba County, New Mexico
Buildings and structures completed in 1880
Schools in New Mexico